"As Tears Go By" is a song written by Mick Jagger, Keith Richards, and Rolling Stones' manager Andrew Loog Oldham. Marianne Faithfull recorded and released it as a single in the United Kingdom in 1964. Her song peaked at number nine on both the UK and Irish singles charts. Later, the Rolling Stones recorded their own version, which was included on the American album December's Children (And Everybody's).  London Records released it as a single, which reached number six in the Billboard Hot 100 singles chart.

History
"As Tears Go By" was one of the first original compositions by Jagger and Richards; previously the Rolling Stones had chiefly been performing American blues and R&B tunes. By one account, Rolling Stones manager Andrew Loog Oldham locked Jagger and Richards in a kitchen in order to force them to write a song together, even suggesting what type of song he wanted: "I want a song with brick walls all around it, high windows and no sex." The result was initially named "As Time Goes By", the title of the song Dooley Wilson sings in the film Casablanca. It was Oldham who replaced "Time" with "Tears".

According to Jagger biographer Philip Norman, the song was mainly created by Jagger, in co-operation with session guitarist Big Jim Sullivan, although Jagger claims he was responsible for the lyrics while Richards wrote the melody. Oldham subsequently gave the ballad (a format that the Stones were not yet known for) to Faithfull, then 17, for her to record as a B-side. Oldham played a demo for her with Jagger singing and Big Jim Sullivan on acoustic guitar. "He handed me a scrawled lyric sheet and I went back into the studio and did it. As soon as I heard the cor anglais playing the opening bars I knew it was going to work. After a couple of takes it was done. Andrew came and gave me a big hug. 'Congratulations darling. You've got yourself a number six,' he said."

The success of the recording caused Decca Records to switch the song to an A-side, where it became a popular single. The melody features a distinctive oboe line. It reached number nine in the UK Singles Chart and launched Faithfull's career as a major singer.  The song entered the Billboard Hot 100 the week ending 28 November 1964, where it stayed for nine weeks peaking at number 22. In Canada, it peaked at number two on the RPM chart. Faithfull performed the song on the television show Hullabaloo, in the segment presented by Beatles manager Brian Epstein from London.

It is unclear if the song was written especially for Faithfull or an out-take from the Stones' repertoire. Author Mark Hodkinson writes in his biography As Tears Go By that she contradicts herself. "All that stuff about how Mick wrote it for me was awfully nice but untrue" she told Penthouse in 1980, writes Hodkinson. "Ten years later, on the sleeve notes for the Blazing Away album Marianne contradicted herself by referring to the record as "the song that Mick Jagger and Keith Richard wrote for me," concludes Hodkinson.

However, in her own autobiography, Faithfull (1994), written together with David Dalton, she says "'As Tears Go By' was not, contrary to popular folklore, written for me, but it fitted me so perfectly it might as well have been". Originally, the A-side of her first record should have been a song written by Lionel Bart, "I Don't Know (How To Tell You)." But that song was "awful", she writes. "It was one of those showbiz songs that needed the proper register.  My voice was just plain wrong! We did take after agonizing take... but I could not simply do it. In desperation Andrew got me to try the song that originally had been planned for the B-side, 'As Tears Go By'."

She admits that she "was never that crazy about 'As Tears Go By.'" "God knows how Mick and Keith wrote it or where it came from... In any case, it is an absolutely astonishing thing for a boy of 20 to have written a song about a woman looking back nostalgically on her life."

The Rolling Stones recorded their own version of "As Tears Go By" in 1965, changing the arrangement from Faithful's 1964 version: her 1964 version features percussion and strings throughout; the Rolling Stones' version completely lacks percussion and opens with acoustic guitar followed by strings entering in the second verse. The string arrangement on the Stones' version was done by Mike Leander.

Billboard described the Rolling Stones' version as a "beautiful folk- flavored ballad...baroque, semi-classical smash hit!"  Cash Box said the Stones gave the song a "hauntingly, plaintive slow-moving laconic, classical-oriented style." The track was a surprise hit on the US Easy Listening chart.

"As Tears Go By" was one of the three songs, including "(I Can't Get No) Satisfaction" and "19th Nervous Breakdown," that the band performed live during their third appearance on The Ed Sullivan Show. It was released as a single in December 1965 by their North American record label, London Records.  DJs across the country made "As Tears Go By" an in-demand hit when they started playing it from the band's recently released album December's Children (And Everybody's). It peaked at number six on the American Billboard Hot 100, and at number 10 on the Billboard Easy Listening chart, years before the seemingly more wholesome Beatles would see their first entry. The song was later released in the UK in 1966 as the B-side to the single, "19th Nervous Breakdown".

The Stones released a version with Italian lyrics as a single in Italy, under the title "Con Le Mie Lacrime" with the lyrics written by Danpa.

The song was performed live on tour for the first time in November 2005 on the Stones' A Bigger Bang Tour. A performance from the 2006 leg of the tour was captured for the 2008 concert film Shine a Light and the accompanying soundtrack album. On 11 July in Milan the Stones performed it with the Italian lyrics. The song was performed as a duet between Jagger and Taylor Swift on 3 June 2013 at the United Center in Chicago, Illinois, for the band's 50 & Counting tour.

Personnel

Marianne Faithfull version

According to musicologist Walter Everett, except where noted:

Marianne Faithfull vocals
Jimmy Page twelve-string acoustic guitar
Unidentified musicians Soprano backing vocals, tambourine, piano, bass, drums, oboe, violins
Mike Leander production, arrangement

Rolling Stones version

According to authors Philippe Margotin and Jean-Michel Guesdon, except where noted:

The Rolling Stones
Mick Jagger vocals
Keith Richards twelve-string acoustic guitar, arrangement

Additional musicians
Mike Leander arrangement and conducting
Unidentified musicians string quartet

Charts

Marianne Faithfull version

Rolling Stones version

Cover versions 

 Nancy Sinatra on her number 1 1966 Boots album.
 Esther Phillips on her album "Esther Phillips Sings" in May 1966.
Shula Chen in a Hebrew version on her album "Yours," in 1969 on the song "פתאום היה לי טוב כל כך (Suddenly I Was So Good)" 
The Royal Guardsmen, sometime in the late 60's; it can be found on their 1995 Anthology CD.
Melanie on her 2002 album Moments from my Life
In 2004, Katy Rose as a B-side on the CD single of her song "I Like".
 The Vitamin String Quartet's cover was used for the season 5 finale of the House episode "Both Sides Now", directed by Greg Yaitanes.
 Noah Gundersen for the Sons of Anarchy: Songs of Anarchy Vol. 3 soundtrack released in 2013.
 Avenged Sevenfold released a version on the deluxe edition of their album The Stage in 2017.

References

Sources

 
 
 
 
 

1960s ballads
1964 debut singles
1965 singles
1966 singles
Marianne Faithfull songs
The Rolling Stones songs
London Records singles
Songs written by Jagger–Richards
Rock ballads
RPM Top Singles number-one singles
Song recordings produced by Andrew Loog Oldham
1964 songs
Decca Records singles
Pop ballads
Songs about nostalgia